Underworld Gang Wars is an upcoming battle royale game developed and published by Mayhem Studios. It will take place in India and focus on the rivalry between two rival gangs.

Gameplay 
Underworld Gang Wars is a AAA title and it will feature an Indian story, setting, gangs, and symbols.

Gameplay revolves around a Western underdog group trying to overthrow its eastern rival.
Each area of the game, from coal mines to an apartment complex, is based on an actual place in India. It features various structures such as a fort, a train station, a stadium, and a race track.

Release 
Pre registrations of Underworld Gang Wars started from 22 May 2021 on Google Play Store.

See also 

 Mumbai Gullies
 Indus Battle Royale

References

External Links 

 Official website

Battle royale games
Android (operating system) games
Multiplayer video games
Third-person shooters
Video games set on islands
Video games set in India
Video games developed in India